Željko Topalović (born March 3, 1972) is a Serbian hotelier and former professional basketball player.

Playing career 
Topalović played for the BFC Beočin in the years when this club was at the top of Yugoslav League and reached the Playoffs Finals in the 1995–96 season. Later he continued his career in the Crvena zvezda and was a member of the great generation that brought the YUBA League title in the 1997–98 season. He also played for the Budućnost and won his second YUBA League title in the 1998–99 season. After that, he returned to the Crvena zvezda. He ended his professional career with the Borac Banja Luka.

National team career 
Topalović was a member of the SFR Yugoslavia national cadet team that won the silver medal at the 1989 European Championship for Cadets in Spain. Over five tournament games, he averaged 3.2 points per game. Also, he represented the SFR Yugoslavia national junior team at the 1991 World Championship for Junior Men in Edmonton, Canada. Over eight tournament games, he averaged 7.4 points per game. Yugoslavia took 4th place.

Post-playing career 
Topalović owns the Zlatarski Zlatnik Hotel in Nova Varoš, located on the slopes of the mountain Zlatar.

Career achievements 
 Yugoslav League champion: 2 (with Crvena zvezda: 1997–98; with Budućnost: 1998–99)

See also 
 List of KK Crvena zvezda players with 100 games played

References

External links
 Profile at FIBA Europe
 Zlatarski Zlatnik Hotel website

1972 births
Living people
Basketball players from Belgrade
Hoteliers
KK BFC players
KK Borac Banja Luka players
KK Crvena zvezda players
KK Budućnost players
KK Sloboda Užice players
KK Profikolor players
Serbian men's basketball players
Serbian expatriate basketball people in Bosnia and Herzegovina
Serbian expatriate basketball people in Montenegro
Yugoslav men's basketball players
Centers (basketball)